Simon Kim Williams (born 30 November 1979) is an English chess grandmaster and author who frequently uses the pseudonym "GingerGM" on social media and commercial material.

Early career
In 1993, he received his first international FIDE rating of 2255. During the same year he finished seventh in the European Under-14 Championship. Williams regularly participated in youth tournaments throughout the 1990s, finishing seventh in the 1997 European Under-20 Championship and finishing second in the Smith and Williamson Young Masters in 1998.

S. Williams vs. Simons, 1999

Williams competed in the 1999 British Chess Championship, held in Scarborough and won by Julian Hodgson. By the time of the tournament's later rounds, Williams had been eliminated from contention for the championship. He, therefore, chose to play the Hammerschlag (1. f3 e5 2. Kf2) in a game against Martin Simons, a very unusual and "ridiculous" opening which needlessly exposes White's king to immediate attack. Williams won the game, and it has since been noted as successful use of a disadvantageous opening.

Following White's initial self-imposed handicap, Black established a straightforward . White then  the position over the next several moves. On the fourteenth move, White activated his ; however, the players traded all of their bishops on the sixteenth and seventeenth moves. On the thirtieth move, the players traded queens. In the final position, White was up two pawns, with multiple immediate checking threats.

Grandmaster
He became a Grandmaster in 2008, achieving the final norm at the Hastings International Chess Congress 2005/2006 and the 2500+ rating at Hastings 2007/2008. His peak rating so far is 2550, achieved in November 2009. In 2009, he organised the Big Slick International in Purley, London, which comprised an invitational GM tournament and FIDE Rated Open.

National performance
In 2003, he finished seventh at the British Chess Championship. Williams later improved his performance in the tournament, finishing equal second in 2009.

International performance

In 2009, Williams finished equal first at the Southend Chess Congress all-play-all tournament.

He was joint winner with Gawain Jones of the London Chess Classic FIDE Rated Open in December 2010, with a rating performance of 2690.

Blitz and rapidplay
In 2005, he won the British Blitz Championship.

Chess commentary
Williams works as a chess commentator at tournaments and through online streaming. Most notably, he has provided official commentary at the Gibraltar Chess Festival alongside Irina Krush, Elisabeth Pähtz in 2016 and Jovanka Houska in 2017 and 2018. He has covered a number of other tournaments for ChessBase and Chess.com. Williams also maintains a YouTube channel where he uploads blitz chess games with commentary as well as analysis of his previous games. He has also given commentary on the Chess.com Isle of Man tournament.

Chess publication company
In 2008, he founded a chess media publishing company called "GingerGM" with International Master Simon Ansell. The company produces print books, ebooks and DVDs.

Works

Books

DVDs

Williams, Simon (2017). The London System with 2.Bf4 (DVD). Hamburg: Chessbase.

Checkmate Show

In 2017, Williams filmed a show named Checkmate. It followed a tournament with some notable competitors, Namely Richard Rapport, Ju Wenjun, Arkadij Naiditsch, and Nigel Short.

References

External links
 
 
 
 
  (1993-2003)
  (2003-)
 

1979 births
Living people
English chess players
Chess grandmasters
English sportswriters
British chess writers
Twitch (service) streamers